The Leopard Society, was a secret society that originated in Sierra Leone. It was believed that members of the society could transform into leopards through the use of witchcraft. The earliest reference to the society in historical literature can be found in George Banbury's "Sierra Leone: or the white man's grave" (1888). The society brought fear to many parts of the world.

History
The Leopard Society was a West African secret society active in the early to mid-20th century. They were originally centred in Sierra Leone but spread to other countries such as Liberia, Côte d'Ivoire and Nigeria.

Among the Efik of Calabar, they were known as Mforoekpe and were dreaded.
Members would dress in leopard skins, waylaying travelers with sharp claw-like weapons in the form of leopards' claws and teeth. The victims' flesh would be cut from their bodies and distributed to members of the secret society. According to their beliefs, the ritual cannibalism would strengthen both members of the secret society as well as their entire tribe.

According to scholar Stephen Ellis:

These were exclusive groups of people who were believed to be liable to possession by the spirits of carnivorous animals such as leopards and crocodiles, and who carried out ritual killings while in a state of possession. During the course of the twentieth century, the Liberian government outlawed these societies, but some of them nevertheless continued to function clandestinely...

Encounters with what is believed to be a survival of the Leopard Society into the post-colonial era are described by Donald MacIntosh and Beryl Bellman.

In fiction
Fictionalized versions of the Leopard Society feature in the Tarzan novel Tarzan and the Leopard Men, in Willard Price's African Adventure, in Hergé's Tintin au Congo and in Hugo Pratt's Le Etiopiche.

An alternate, more egalitarian version of the Leopard Society appears in the "Nsibidi Script" series by Nnedi Okorafor. 

Robert E. Howard also mentions them in his horror/detective short story "Black Talons".

A different take of the Leopard Men appears in The Legend of Tarzan. This version of the group are actually leopards that were magically uplifted by La.

A fictional incarnation also appears in the 2016 film The Legend of Tarzan. It is led by a chieftain named Mbonga (portrayed by the Beninois actor Djimon Honsou) whose son was killed by Tarzan. Léon Rom later cut a deal with Mbonga where he would draw Tarzan to him in exchange for the diamonds on his land. When Tarzan and Mbonga duel, the latter learns that his son was responsible for killing Kala. As the Mangani hold the rest of the Leopard Society at bay, Tarzan defeats Mbonga and spares his life as Mbonga weeps over the fact that he and Tarzan each lost someone they loved.

In art
A representation of leopard-men–the inspiration for Hergé's Tintin au Congo–is the sculpture group in one of the large exhibition halls of the Royal Museum for Central Africa, Tervuren, commissioned by the Belgium Ministry of Colonies from artist Paul Wissaert and acquired by the museum in 1913.

See also
 Crocodile Society
 Poro society
 Secret society

References

Sources
The International Encyclopedia of Secret Societies & Fraternal Orders, Alan Axelrod, 1997, Checkmark Books

External links
 The Leopard Society in the Nimba Range and at the Kru coast
 1900-1950: The Leopard Society in 'Vai country' in Bassaland
 Human Leopards: An account of the trials of human leopards before the special commission court: With a note on Sierra Leone, Past and present

African secret societies
Cannibalism in Africa
Social history of Liberia
History of Sierra Leone
History of Ivory Coast